Johnny Greenwood may refer to:
 Jonny Greenwood, English musician and composer
 Johnny Greenwood (singer), Australian country music singer

See also
 John Greenwood (disambiguation)